Committee on the Budget can refer to:
 United States House Committee on the Budget
 United States Senate Committee on the Budget
 Committee on Budgetary Control (European Parliament)